Johannes Clemens Maria "Jan" van der Horst (born 1 September 1948) is a retired Dutch rower who won a bronze medal in the coxless pairs at the 1975 World Rowing Championships, together with Willem Boeschoten. They competed in this event at the 1976 Summer Olympics and finished in tenth place.

References

 

1948 births
Living people
Dutch male rowers
Olympic rowers of the Netherlands
Rowers at the 1976 Summer Olympics
Sportspeople from Schiedam
World Rowing Championships medalists for the Netherlands
20th-century Dutch people
21st-century Dutch people